Koussanar is a town in central Senegal in Tambacounda Department.

Transport 

It is served by a station on the national railway network.

See also 

 Railway stations in Senegal

References 

Populated places in Senegal